Nakhon Nayok City is a capital of Nakhon Nayok province in the central region of Thailand.

The city (thesaban mueang) covers tambon Nakhon Nayok and parts of Tha Chang, Ban Yai, Wang Krachom, and Phrom Ni of Mueang Nakhon Nayok district. In 2006 it had a population of 17,385. It lies 116 km northeast of Bangkok.

References

External links

Populated places in Nakhon Nayok province
Cities and towns in Thailand